The 24th Submarine Division (Russian: Дивизия АПЛ СФ 24) is a unit of the Northern Fleet of the Russian Navy.
 - Atomic Submarine)  (SF as an abbreviation of Severni flot - Northern Fleet) and the division number 24 together.

History 
With the Soviet Union launching submarines equipped with cruise missiles, the Soviet Navy, formed new formations to operate them.

The formation of the 24th Division was ordered by the Chief of Staff of the Navy from 11 May 1985 and implemented in the same year largely. Established 30 October 1985. Submarines were taken from existing formations and assigned to the newly formed division. First commander of the newly created division was Captain First Rank Mikhailovich.

Commanders 
Jul 1985-Oct 1987 VADM Vladimir Mikhaylovich Monastyrshin
Oct 1987-Dec 1989 VADM Nikolay Ivanovich Mazin
Dec 1989-Jun 1992 RADM Boris Sergeyevich Bogdanov
Sep 1992-Jun 1996 RADM Sergey Anatolyevich Bliznyuk
Jun 1996-Sep 1998 RADM Aleksandr Nikolayevich Bukin
Sep 1998-Aug 2000 RADM Aleksey Vitalyevich Burilichev
Aug 2000-xxx 200x RADM Vladimir Ivanovich Korolev
xxx 200x-present  RADM Anatoliy Minakov

Ships 
 I-class SSN Pantera (K-317)
Akula I-class SSN Volk (K-461)
Akula I-class SSN Leopard (K-328)
Akula I-class SSN Tigr (K-154) 
Akula II-class SSN Vepr (K-157)
Akula II-class SSN Gepard (K-335)

References

External links
 http://www.ww2.dk/new/navy/24dipl.htm

Naval units and formations of the Soviet Union
Submarine units and formations
Military units and formations established in 1985
1985 establishments in the Soviet Union